Fairdealing is an unincorporated community in Marshall County, Kentucky, United States. A couple of stores and Jonathan Elementary School are located in this community.

In 1838, a post office was established in the community said to be named for storekeeper whose deals were perceived as fair.  The post office was discontinued in 1908.

References

Unincorporated communities in Marshall County, Kentucky
Unincorporated communities in Kentucky